The Alexander Sacher Masoch Prize is a literary award which is conferred by the Literaturhaus, Vienna. The prize, worth 7,000 euro, is to support young Austrian writers. It was created in 1994 by the widow of the writer Alexander Sacher Masoch (1901–1972) and was initially awarded every three years.

Recipients
2012 Doreen Daume (Translators' Prize)
2006 Grazer Autorenversammlung
2000 Kathrin Röggla 
1997 Elfriede Czurda 
1994 Robert Menasse

References
Alexander Sacher Masoch Stiftung (in German) retrieved 21 August 2016

Austrian literary awards
Literary awards honouring young writers
Awards established in 1994
1994 establishments in Austria